The Cloquet-Northern Office Building is the historic headquarters for several offices in Cloquet, Minnesota owned by the Weyerhaeuser family.  The building was constructed in the early spring and summer of 1919, after the Cloquet fire on October 12, 1918 that caused extensive destruction in Carlton and St. Louis counties.  The building housed the Cloquet Lumber Company, the Northern Lumber Company, the Northwest Paper Company, the St. Louis River Mercantile Company, the Duluth and Northeastern Railroad, the Cloquet Tie and Post Company, and the Knife Falls Boom Company. The building was listed on the National Register of Historic Places in 1985.

References

Office buildings on the National Register of Historic Places in Minnesota
Office buildings completed in 1919
National Register of Historic Places in Carlton County, Minnesota
1919 establishments in Minnesota
Cloquet, Minnesota
Timber industry